Dypsis tsaravoasira is a species of flowering plant in the Arecaceae family. It is a palm endemic to Madagascar, where it grows in rainforests. There are perhaps 500 plants remaining, and the population is decreasing due to overharvest.

References

tsaravoasira
Endemic flora of Madagascar
Endangered plants
Taxonomy articles created by Polbot
Taxa named by Henk Jaap Beentje
Flora of the Madagascar lowland forests
Flora of the Madagascar subhumid forests